The Statistical Classification of Economic Activities in the European Community, commonly referred to as NACE (for the French term "nomenclature statistique des activités économiques dans la Communauté européenne"), is the industry standard classification system used in the European Union. The current version is revision 2 and was established by Regulation (EC) No 1893/2006. It is the European implementation of the UN classification ISIC, revision 4.

There is a correspondence between NACE and United Nations' International Standard Industrial Classification of all Economic Activities.

NACE is similar in function to the SIC and NAICS systems:
 Standard Industrial Classification
 North American Industry Classification System

NACE uses four hierarchical levels:
 Level 1: 21 sections identified by alphabetical letters A to U; 
 Level 2: 88 divisions identified by two-digit numerical codes (01 to 99); 
 Level 3: 272 groups identified by three-digit numerical codes (01.1 to 99.0); 
 Level 4: 615 classes identified by four-digit numerical codes (01.11 to 99.00).

The first four digits of the code, which is the first four levels of the classification system, are the same in all European countries. National implementations may introduce additional levels. The fifth digit might vary from country to country and further digits are sometimes placed by suppliers of databases.

Level 1 Codes 
The 21 Level 1 codes are:

References

External links 
For a full list of NACE Codes, please refer to:
 Statistical Classification of Economic Activities in the European Community, Rev. 2 (2008) (NACE Rev. 2)
 European Commission, DG ECFIN,Further information on NACE rev.2 and Business and Consumer Surveys
 Browse the NACE code hierarchy in multiple languages
For NACE Rev.2 in Turkish economy, refer to www.turkanalitik.com Home

Industry classifications
Economy of the European Union